The Sanjak of Albania was a second-level administrative unit of the Ottoman Empire between 1415 and 1466. Its mandate included territories of modern central and southern Albania between Krujë to the Kalamas River in northwestern Greece.

Background 

During the 14th century, Ottoman rule began to extend over the Eastern Mediterranean and the Balkans. The division of the Albania into small, quarreling fiefdoms ruled by independent feudal lords and tribal chiefs made them easy prey for the Ottoman armies. In 1385, the ruler of Durrës, Karl Thopia, appealed to the sultan for support against his rivals, the Balšić family. An Ottoman force quickly marched into Albania along the Via Egnatia and routed Balša II in the Battle of Savra. The principal Albanian clans soon swore fealty to the Ottoman Empire. The Ottomans allowed conquered Albanian clan chiefs to maintain their positions and property, but they had to pay tribute, send their sons to the Ottoman court as hostages, and provide the Ottoman army with auxiliary troops.

History 

The sanjak was established by 1415–17. Since 1431, the capital of the sanjak seems to have been Vlorë.

In the 1431–32 period all rural and urban households and their property were registered in all ten districts of the Arvanid sanjak. The 1432 register shows that districts in the Sanjak of Albania were further divided on 335 timars, each composed by two or three villages. The Arvanid register is one of the earliest available land registers in Ottoman Empire's archives, and was published in 1954.

In 1432 Andrew Thopia and Gjergj Arianiti revolted against the empire. When the Albanian Revolt of 1432–36 began the sanjakbey of Albania was Ali Bey Evrenosoglu. The uprising was finally suppressed during the 1435–36 campaigns of Ali Bey and Turakhan Beg.

In 1437, when Teodor III Muzaka revolted against the Ottomans, the sanjak-bey of Albania was his son Yakup Bey. In 1437–38 Skanderbeg was appointed the subaşi of Krujë, after which Hizir Bey was again appointed to that position in November 1438. The first position of Hadim Sehabeddin Pasha outside the sultan's palace was the position of sanjakbey of the Sanjak of Albania, which he held until 1439 when he was appointed as beylerbey of the Rumelia Eyalet. When in 1441 Përmet was annexed to the sanjak of Albania, Yakup Bey is mentioned as its sanjakbey. He remained on the position of the sanjakbey of the Sanjak of Albania until September 1442 when he was killed as one of 16 Ottoman sanjakbeys under command of Hadim Sehabeddin Pasha who were all killed by Christian forces commanded by Janos Hunyadi in a battle near Ialomița River.

Hadim Suleiman Pasha was the sanjak-bey of Albania briefly before becoming the sanjak-bey of Smederevo.

The Sanjak of Albania was disestablished in 1444, after The League of Lezhë was formed. After Elbasan fell into Ottoman hands once again the construction of Elbasan Castle  saw the establishment of the Sanjak of Elbasan. The new sanjak incorporated Isbat (Shpat) and Çermenika. At the same time the Sanjak of Avlona (Vlorë) was established with the sub-districts (kaza) of Skrapar, Përmet, Pogon, Tepelenë and Gjirokastër.

Administration 

The newly occupied Albanian lands were organized into the sancak-i Arvanid ("sanjak of the Arvanids"), a military-administrative district subject to the larger Rumelia Eyalet (Ottoman Balkans). The sanjak was subdivided into nine vilayets, sub-districts including a city and its surrounding villages, headed by beys. The vilayets in turn were subdivided into nahiyes under the supervision of a naib (district-judge). The Sanjak of Albania represents the first definition of Albania by the Ottoman Empire as a territorial unit, linking the Albanian language to a specific territory.

In 1431–32 the Ottoman governor Umur Bey compiled a defter (cadastral survey) in the sanjak, which stretched from Krujë in the north to the Kalamas river valley in the south.

Governors 
Ali Bey Evrenosoglu ( 1432–37)
Yakup Bey (1437–38)
Hadım Şehabeddin (1438–39)
Yakup Bey ( 1441–September 1442)
Hadım Suleiman Pasha (?)

References

Sources

 
 

Ottoman Albania
Sanjaks of the Ottoman Empire in Europe
15th-century establishments in the Ottoman Empire
1466 disestablishments in the Ottoman Empire
1415 establishments in Europe
1466 disestablishments in Europe